Walter George Keith Duncan , (1903-1987) was an Australian academic and political scientist.

Education
Duncan was educated at Fort Street Boys' High School, Sydney, completing his education, BA and MA at the University of Sydney and PhD at the London School of Economics.

Career
Duncan returned to Australia in 1932 where he taught at the University of Sydney.

Duncan joined the University of Adelaide in 1951 as the chair of history and political science. Duncan retired in 1968, but in 1973 completed a previously unfinished commissioned centenary history of the University of Adelaide.

In 1962, Duncan delivered the fourth in the annual series of ABC Boyer Lectures)  "In Defence of the Common Man".

Personal
Duncan was born on 11 July 1903 in Leichardt, Sydney, to New Zealanders George Henry Duncan and Clara Walton. Duncan married Dorothy Mary Anderson in 1934, but had no children. He died on 18 December 1987.

Honours and awards
 1956 Elected Fellow of the Academy of the Social Sciences in Australia

References

1903 births
1987 deaths
Alumni of the London School of Economics
University of Sydney alumni
Academic staff of the University of Adelaide
Academic staff of the University of Sydney
People educated at Fort Street High School
Fellows of the Academy of the Social Sciences in Australia